James Bernard Carroll (January 10, 1856 – January 8, 1932) was an associate justice of the Massachusetts Supreme Judicial Court from January 20, 1915, until his death.  He had previously served as Associate Justice of the Massachusetts Superior Court from December 21, 1914 to January 20, 1915.

Biography 
James Bernard Carroll was born in Lowell, Massachusetts on January 10, 1856. He graduated from College of the Holy Cross in 1878, and earned an LL.B. degree from the Boston University School of Law in 1880.

He married Mary E. Corbett on July 15, 1884.

He died from pneumonia at his home in Springfield, Massachusetts on January 8, 1932.

References 

 

Justices of the Massachusetts Supreme Judicial Court
1856 births
1932 deaths
Boston University School of Law alumni
College of the Holy Cross alumni